(-‡ 2005 to 2008) served as the Chairman of the National Executive Council of the Boy Scouts of Japan.

Background
In 1975, Negishi was awarded the 105th Bronze Wolf, the only distinction of the World Organization of the Scout Movement, awarded by the World Scout Committee for exceptional services to world Scouting, at the 25th World Scout Conference. In 1994 he also received the highest distinction of the Scout Association of Japan, the Golden Pheasant Award.

Works 
。

Further reading

References

External links

 

Recipients of the Bronze Wolf Award
Year of death missing
Year of birth missing
Scouting in Japan